Jatun Salla (Quechua jatun big, salla large cliff or gravel, "big cliff (or gravel)") is a  mountain in the Bolivian Andes. It is located in the Cochabamba Department, at the border of the Arani Province, Vacas Municipality, and the Carrasco Province, Pocona Municipality.

References 

Mountains of Cochabamba Department